Two Graduated Jiggers is the second album by Jon Wayne. It was released in 2000 via Waco's Goats.

Critical reception
No Depression called the album "as darkly foul and funny a masterwork as its predecessor," writing that Wayne "grunts, warbles, and slurs lyrics like a low-voiced bourboned-up Walter Brennan with Tourette’s."

Track listing 

Texas Fuel Injection - 0:57 (Jimbo)
Generator - 3:51 (Don Heffington)
Texas Moquine Bird - 2:01 (J. Wayne)
I Caught Me A Squirrel - 1:13 (J. Wayne & Jimbo)
I Do Drive Truck - 2:16 (J. Wayne)
Time To Drink Whiskey - 3:36 (Don Heffington)
Texas Drum Cooker - 2:47 (J. Wayne & Jimbo)
Texas Learning Center - 0:17 (J. Wayne)
Country Porno - 2:15 (J. Wayne)
Old MacDonald - 0:24 (Trad.)
Donkey-Mule - 2:02 (J. Wayne & Jimbo)
Mandolin Man - 3:59 (Marvin Etzioni)
Death And Texas - 2:18 (J. Wayne)
Rock It Billy - 2:03 (Jimbo)
Las Vegas Audition - 5:06 (J. Wayne)
Texas Jackin' Ledge - 2:57 (J. Wayne & T. Turlock)
Jimbo's Clown Room - 0:09 (Jimbo)
Balloon-Indian Girl - 0:51 (J. Wayne)
Texas Genealogy - 6:15 (J. Wayne)
International Squirrel - 2:54 (J. Wayne & Jibo)
Texas Assonance - 14:39 (J. Wayne)

Personnel 
Jon Wayne: guitar, organs, piano, vocal
Jimbo: drums, tuba, vocal
Earnest Beauvine: lead guitar, horns, pedal steels
Timmy Turlock: bass
Jon Wayne: record producer
Charlie McGovern: cover layout
Cheryl Swarens-Vaught: cover photos
John Cerney: billboard
Spleef: mixdown
Annie Harvey: band photos

Additional notes 
Recorded 1993 through 1999 at Tandouri Sound, CA

References

2000 albums
Jon Wayne albums